Shelburne is a census-designated place (CDP) comprising the central village and surrounding suburban land in the town of Shelburne, Chittenden County, Vermont, United States. As of the 2020 census, the CDP had a population of 6,178, out of 7,717 in the entire town.

The CDP is in western Chittenden County, in the central part of the town of Shelburne, extending to the north and south borders of the town. U.S. Route 7 runs the length of the CDP, leading north into South Burlington and south into the town of Charlotte. The Shelburne Museum is in the southwest part of the CDP, on the west side of Route 7.

References 

Populated places in Chittenden County, Vermont
Census-designated places in Chittenden County, Vermont
Census-designated places in Vermont